Aquathlon competitions at the 2019 World Beach Games in Doha, Qatar were held from 14 to 15 October 2019.

Format
The World Beach Games aquathlon contained three components in each individual event; a  run,  swim, and a  run, and three components each athlete in mixed team event; a  run,  swim, and a  run.

Qualification
The qualification period ends on 3 October 2019. A total of 60 athletes (30 for each gender) vied for the coveted spots with a maximum of two sent to compete for the first twenty-four ITU Aquathlon Rankings ranked athletes, while the other NOCs might have one athlete per event.

24 quotas per gender will be decided based on ITU Aquathlon Ranking List in June 2019. Host nation Qatar will be ensured two quota places each gender. The remaining 4 quotas will be eligible for Invitation Places.

Medal summary

Medal table

Medalists

Participating nations

References

External links
Results book

Aquathlon
2018
World Beach Games
2019